Ebrahim Kandi (also Romanized as Ebrāhīm Kandī) is a village in Pain Barzand Rural District, Anguti District, Germi County, Ardabil Province, Iran. At the 2006 census, its population was 128, in 27 families.

References 

Tageo

Towns and villages in Germi County